Echmatocrinus is a Cambrian animal which resembles a crinoid or an octocoral. Its exact taxonomy is still a subject of debate. It is known only from the Burgess shale. 5 specimens of Echmatocrinus are known from the Greater Phyllopod bed, where they comprise < 0.1% of the community.

The creature was a little like an inverted cone, with a crown of seven to nine tentacles. Each tentacle was covered with small extensions. The cone itself was covered with irregularly arranged mineralised plates.  The organisms lived a solitary lifestyle, although juveniles are sometimes attached to (or budding from) adults.

References

External links

Further reading
Ausich, W. I. 1998a. Early phylogeny and subclass division of the Crinoidea (phylum Echinodermata). Journal of Paleontology 72 (3): 499–510.

Ausich, W. I. 1998b. Origin of the Crinoidea. In Echinoderms: San Francisco (R. Mooi & M. Telford, eds.) pp. 127–132. A. A. Balkema: Rotterdam.

Ausich, W. I. 1999. Origin of crinoids. In Echinoderm Research 1998 (M. D. Candia Carnevali & F. Bonasoro, eds.) pp. 237–242. A. A. Balkema: Rotterdam.

Sprinkle, J., & R. C. Moore. 1978. Echmatocrinea. In Treatise on Invertebrate Paleontology pt. T. Echinodermata 2. Crinoidea (R. C. Moore & C. Teichert, eds.) vol. 2, pp. T405-T407. The Geological Society of America, Inc.: Boulder (Colorado), and The University of Kansas: Lawrence (Kansas). 

Burgess Shale fossils
Enigmatic prehistoric animal genera
Fossil taxa described in 1973
Cambrian genus extinctions